Jean-Pierre or Pierre Blaud (1773/1774, Nîmes – 8 May 1859, Beaucaire),
 
often seen as P. Blaud of/de Beaucaire
 
was a French doctor of medicine who in 1832
 
introduced and started the use of Blaud's pills or iron pills as a medication for patients with anemia.
 
Blaud of Beaucaire was one of the leading physicians at the Hospital of Beaucaire (l'Hospital de Beaucaire) in France.

References

1774 births
1859 deaths
19th-century French physicians
People from Nîmes